Tomášek (feminine Tomášková) is a common Czech surname, meaning "little Thomas". Notable people include:

 Bohumil Tomášek, Czech basketball player
 David Tomášek (born 1996), Czech professional ice hockey player
 František Tomášek (1899–1992), archbishop of Prague, cardinal
 Josef Tomášek (1904–1979), Czech water polo player 
 Juraj Tomášek (born 1988), Slovak football midfielder
 Martin Tomášek, Czech ice hockey player
 Rudolf Tomášek (born 1937), Czech athlete
 Václav Tomášek (1774–1850), Czech composer

Notable people with the Germanized version of the surname Tomaschek include:
 Róbert Tomaschek (born 1972), Slovak footballer
 Rudolf Tomaschek (1895–1966), a German experimental physicist
 Wilhelm Tomaschek (1841–1901), a Czech-Austrian geographer and orientalist

Czech-language surnames
Patronymic surnames
Surnames from given names